Liam Wilson (born December 22, 1979) is an American musician. He has been the bass player for The Dillinger Escape Plan since 2000 and is a former bass player of Starkweather. Currently, he is a part of Azusa, a project formed with members of Extol and Sea + Air, as well as John Frum, which features a John Zorn collaborator and ex-member of The Faceless. He is an advocate of veganism.

Personal life
Concerned about environmental causes, Wilson wore a shirt with the homemade message "Stop MTM/VF" on The Dillinger Escape Plan's February 2, 2008 appearance on Late Night with Conan O'Brien.  Wilson has been a big advocate for veganism and has appeared in several pro-vegan advertisements for PETA, although in recent years he has distanced himself from the organization and is more flexible about those beliefs because of his yoga, and transcendental meditation practices.

Wilson is capable of playing both finger-style and with a pick, although he used a pick almost exclusively with The Dillinger Escape Plan as he felt it fit the music more.

Other work
Wilson was featured on the cover of Bass Players September 2013 issue, and has also written several columns for the magazine, in which he extols the virtues of Bikram yoga in relation to his bass playing. 

Wilson performed with the band Frodus (aptly labeled "Frodus Escape Plan") for a few reunion shows in March 2009 as a statement in response to the bank bailouts and the uncovering of corporate corruption in the financial sector.

As of February 2017, Wilson is the bass player for psychedelic death metal band John Frum.

Wilson formed the band Azusa with members of Extol and Sea + Air, with plans of releasing their debut album in November 2018.

In 2020 Wilson was tapped up to perform in one of Devin Townsend's live bands that year.

Bands 

Current
 Azusa – bass (2014–present)
 John Frum – bass (2011–present)
 Devin Townsend – live bass (2020)

Former
 The Dillinger Escape Plan – bass (2000–2017)
 Burnside – bass
 For Life – bass
 Frodus – bass (2009–2010)
 Starkweather – bass (2005)

Discography

With The Dillinger Escape Plan 
 Irony Is a Dead Scene (2002)
 Miss Machine (2004)
 Ire Works (2007)
 Option Paralysis (2010)
 One of Us Is the Killer (2013)
 Dissociation (2016)

With Starkweather 
 Croatoan (2006)

With Frodus 
 Soundlab 1 (2010)

With John Frum 
 A Stirring in the Noos (2017)

With Azusa 
 Heavy Yoke (2018)

References

1979 births
21st-century American bass guitarists
21st-century American male musicians
American heavy metal bass guitarists
American male bass guitarists
Living people
Progressive metal bass guitarists
The Dillinger Escape Plan members